Stash Financial, Inc., or simply Stash, is an American financial technology and financial services company based in New York, NY. The company operates both a web platform and mobile apps, allowing users to incrementally invest small amounts. It also provides robo advice. By summer 2017, it had approximately 1 million users. As of July 2020, the number has grown to over 5 million.

History and services 
Stash was founded in February 2015 by Brandon Krieg, David Ronick, and Ed Robinson.

It was launched on the iOS App Store in October 2015 and was made available on Android in March 2016.

In February 2018, the firm raised $37.5 million in a Series D funding in a round led by Union Square Ventures.  In April 2020, it raised another $112 million in a Series F funding in a round led by LendingTree.

Reception 
In February 2018, CNBC praised the app's automation and ease-of-use.

Products and services
Stash offers retirement, banking, individual investment, and custodial accounts through a subscription model.

Through the web platform and mobile apps, users can invest as little as $0.01 increments into fractional shares of thousands of stocks and more than 80 exchange-traded funds (ETFs). Users can invest in personal brokerage accounts, retirement accounts, Roth IRAs, traditional IRAs, or custodial accounts. Stash also offers financial education and automatic investing.

See also 
 Acorns

References

Financial services companies based in New York City
Financial services companies established in 2015
2015 establishments in New York City
Financial technology companies
Privately held companies based in New York City
American companies established in 2015

